Ethyl methylphenylglycidate, commonly known as strawberry aldehyde, is an organic compound used in the flavor industry in artificial fruit flavors, in particular strawberry.

Uses
Because of its pleasant taste and aroma, ethyl methylphenylglycidate finds use in the fragrance industry, in artificial flavors, and in cosmetics.  Its end applications include perfumes, soaps, beauty care products, detergents, pharmaceuticals, baked goods, candies, ice cream, and others.

Chemistry
Ethyl methylphenylglycidate contains ester and epoxide functional groups, despite its common name, lacks presence of an aldehyde.  It is a colourless liquid that is insoluble in water.

Ethyl methylphenylglycidate is usually prepared by the condensation of acetophenone and the ethyl ester of monochloroacetic acid in the presence of a base, in a reaction known as the Darzens condensation.

Safety
Long-term, high-dose studies in rats have demonstrated that ethyl methylphenylglycidate has no significant adverse health effects and is not carcinogenic.  The US Food and Drug Administration has classified ethyl methylphenylglycidate as generally recognized as safe (GRAS).

See also
 List of strawberry topics

References

Ethyl esters
Epoxides
Flavors
Food additives
Perfume ingredients
Strawberries